Man with a Gun may refer to:

 Man with a Gun (1958 film), a British crime film
 Man with a Gun (1995 film), a Canadian crime-thriller film
 "Man with a Gun", a song from the album Casual Gods

See also
 The Man with the Gun, a 1938 Soviet history drama film
 Man with the Gun, a 1955 black and white Western film